Akyauk  is a village in Chipwi Township in Myitkyina District in the Kachin State of north-eastern Burma.

Nearby towns and villages include Rgangpi (5.4 nm), Shachinpok (5.4 nm), Pawngen (2.1 nm), Pawzang (2.0 nm), Luchang (2.1 nm) and Tawung (2.2 nm).

References

External links
Satellite map at Maplandia.com

Populated places in Kachin State
Chipwi Township